Parfait Medou-Otye (born 29 November 1976, in Ekoudendi, Cameroon) is a French former footballer born in the Cameroon. Medou-Otye played a central defender and midfielder in France with Le Havre AC and Le Mans Union Club 72. After leaving France, he played in the United Kingdom for Greenock Morton, Kidderminster Harriers, Stourport Swifts and Bromsgrove Rovers, before heading to Réunion to finish his career.

Career

He played as a defender in Scotland for Greenock Morton after starting his career with Le Havre AC in France, with a short spell on loan with Le Mans Union Club 72. After Morton suffered from financial hardships, Medou-Otye signed for Kidderminster Harriers before having to retire due to a heart condition.

He returned to France, but after a short time out of the game was told that he did not have a heart condition. Medou-Otye made a comeback in the lower levels of the English game with Stourport Swifts, before 
moving to Bromsgrove Rovers, Medou-Otye played only 25 minutes for them before sustaining an injury and leaving through mutual consent.

After leaving England, Medou-Otye moved to Réunion for a while to play.

After football

He is now working as an agent and has his own clothing label.

External links

References

Living people
1976 births
French footballers
Cameroonian footballers
French sportspeople of Cameroonian descent
Association football defenders
Greenock Morton F.C. players
Kidderminster Harriers F.C. players
Stourport Swifts F.C. players
Bromsgrove Rovers F.C. players
Le Mans FC players
Le Havre AC players
Scottish Football League players
French expatriate footballers
Expatriate footballers in Scotland
Expatriate footballers in England
French expatriate sportspeople in Scotland
French expatriate sportspeople in England
English Football League players